The Indian national cricket team toured Pakistan during the 2003–04 cricket season. India played five One Day International matches and three Test matches against the Pakistan cricket team. The series was called the Samsung Cup for sponsorship reasons. India won the ODI series 3-2 and the Test series 2-1.

Background 
It was announced in early January 2004 that India would tour Pakistan in March that year. After India's team management and players expressed security concerns in Pakistan, the Board of Control for Cricket in India sent a three-member team in February to assess the situation and reported that they were "satisfied with the (security) measures being planned by Pakistan". Happy with their report, the Indian government gave a go-ahead to the tour after a few days.

India entered the Test series never having won a Test on Pakistani soil.

Squads 

India's 15-man squad for the Test series was announced on 22 March 2004. Yuvraj Singh, rewarded for his consistent performances in the domestic circuit, and spinner Anil Kumble and medium-pacer Ajit Agarkar, who recovered from injuries, were included. The squad comprised seven batsmen, four medium-pacer and three spinners. The Pakistan Test squad was announced three days later. Batsmen Shahid Afridi and Younis Khan were dropped, and leg-spinner Danish Kaneria was included.

India's captain Sourav Ganguly was ruled out of the side due to an injured back before the First Test. Rahul Dravid, who had previously led India only once, was named the stand-in captain. Ganguly returned for the Third Test as player and captain. Also, Ashish Nehra was brought in the side in Ajit Agarkar's place for that Test.

Tour match

Pakistan A v Indians

ODI series

1st ODI

2nd ODI

3rd ODI

4th ODI

5th ODI

Test series

1st Test

2nd Test

3rd Test

References

External links
 Tour home at ESPNcricinfo
 Tour home at The Tribune
 

2004 in Indian cricket
2004 in Pakistani cricket
2003-04
International cricket competitions in 2003–04
Pakistani cricket seasons from 2000–01